The RS Vareo is a modern, single-handed sailing dinghy raced throughout the UK at both club and national level. The RS Vareo is a hiking singlehander with an asymmetric spinnaker.
 
Fleets have grown throughout the UK and a racing circuit has been developed by the RS Association with sponsored events & championships. The GUL RS Vareo National Championships saw a record fleet of 47 competing at Netley SC in July 2007.

Performance and design
The RS Vareo has a PY of 1085, making it a little faster than the Laser dinghy in the RYA scheme.

However its D-PN is slower than that of a Laser, at 92.7. The boat is characterised in having good stability up and downwind, well-mannered handling and enough room in the cockpit to take a friend out when not racing. The addition of the spinnaker ensures the boat is far more exciting & exhilarating than a conventional monohull.

Without the complications of a trapeze, the handling characteristics allow a broad range of sailors get the most out of their time on the water; without the challenges and pitfalls of a faster asymmetric single hander.

References

External links
 RS Sailing (Global HQ)
 ISAF Connect to Sailing
 International RS Classes Association
 UK RS Association
 German RS Class Association
 Plachetnice RS Vareo - Asociace lodních tříd RS - moderní jachting a plachetnice RS v Čechách a na Slovensku

Dinghies
2000s sailboat type designs
Boats designed by Phil Morrison
Sailboat types built by RS Sailing